Blinovsky is a rural locality (a khutor) in Proninskoye Rural Settlement, Serafimovichsky District, Volgograd Oblast, Russia. The population was 62 as of 2010. There are 6 streets.

Geography 
Blinovsky is located on the Tsutskan River, 60 km southwest of Serafimovich (the district's administrative centre) by road. Peschany is the nearest rural locality.

References 

Rural localities in Serafimovichsky District